Cordaitaceae is an extinct family of conifers. 
It was named after Czech botanist and mycologist August Carl Joseph Corda.

Conifers of this family were common in the Carboniferous and in the Permian.

References

Cordaitales
Prehistoric plant families